Oedipina altura, commonly known as Cartago worm salamander, is a species of salamander in the family Plethodontidae.
It is endemic to Cordillera de Talamanca in Costa Rica.

Its natural habitat is tropical moist montane forests.
It is threatened by habitat loss.

References

Oedipina
Endemic fauna of Costa Rica
Amphibians of Costa Rica
Taxonomy articles created by Polbot
Amphibians described in 1968